Love All Play is a 2022 South Korean television series starring Park Ju-hyun, Chae Jong-hyeop, Park Ji-hyun, Kim Mu-jun and Seo Ji-hye. The series depicts a hot sports romance in a badminton business team. It premiered on KBS2 on April 20, 2022, and aired every Wednesday and Thursday at 21:50 (KST) with 16 episodes. It is also available for streaming on Disney+ in selected regions.

Love All Play drew the lowest-ever peak and average ratings for a Korean drama airing on free television during prime time. Unprecedentedly, its ratings never broke the 2% mark, as its pilot episode rating of 1.9% was its highest. Its ratings dipped to a low of 0.9% for its penultimate episode, with only  the 2020 drama Welcome scoring a lower single-episode rating of 0.8%. Overall, the ratings of Love All Play averaged 1.4%, beating the previous record low of 1.6% set by MBC drama Oh My Ladylord in 2021.

Synopsis 
The series is a sports romance drama about the passion and affectionate love between the male and female mixed-doubles protagonists within their group of badminton team members.

Cast

Main 
 Park Ju-hyun as Park Tae-yang, a badminton player whose life is all about sports.
 Chae Jong-hyeop as Park Tae-joon, a player who views badminton as just a profession. A person who dreams of a comfortable life after his retirement, but joins the business team Yunis after being cut off from the city hall team.
 Park Ji-hyun as Park Jun-young, Tae-joon older sister. She is an Olympic gold medalist who retired due to an accident.
 Kim Mu-jun as Yook Jeong-hwan
 Seo Ji-hye as Lee Yoo-min, the queen of overlapping jinxes.

Supporting

Yunis Badminton Team coaches 
 Jo Han-chul as Lee Tae-sang
 In Gyo-jin as Joo Sang-hyeon, Yunis's Tiger coach due to his austere personality and strict rules. So he leads the team. Hence, he is known as 'Juralli' for players.
 Lee Seo-hwan as Kim Si-bon, Yunis Team trainer.

Yunis Badminton Team players 
 Choi Seung-yoon as Yeon Seung-woo
 Jo Soo-hyang as Lee Young-shim
 Moon Dong-hyeok as Go Dong-wan
 Kwon So-hyun as Cheon Yu-ri
 Bin Chan-wook as Oh Seon-su
 Jeon Hye-won as Yang Seong-sil
 Lee Chae-min as Lee Ji-ho
 Kim Nu-rim as New players

Others 
 Jeon Bae-soo as Park Man-soo, Tae-yang's father.
 Lee Ji-hyun as Tae-joon and Jun-young's mother.
 Sung Ki-yoon as Park Nam-goo, Tae-joon's father and Badminton equipment shop owner.

Extended 
 Park Doo-shik as Koo Hyuk-bong, National badminton player. 
 Lee Min-jae as Eden,of Han Woong Electronics, especially as Yook Jung-hwan's junior and rival.

Special appearance 
 Kim Hyun-joo as President of Eunice Business Team.
 Jin Seon-kyu as A sushi restaurant owner, who has a special relationship with Park Tae-yang.

Production 
The first script reading of the cast was held at the KBS annex in October 2021.

On February 18, 2022, Chae Jong-hyeop tested positive for the COVID-19 self-diagnosis kit and conducted a PCR test. A day later, it was revealed that he tested negative for COVID-19 PCR test and filming resumed soon as it was confirmed that Chae Jong-hyeop tested negative.

Original soundtrack

Part 1

Part 2

Part 3

Part 4

Part 5

Part 6

Part 7

Part 8

Part 9

Ratings

References

External links 
  
  

Badminton mass media
Korean-language television shows
Korean Broadcasting System television dramas
South Korean romance television series
South Korean sports television series
2022 South Korean television series debuts
2022 South Korean television series endings